Barenaked may refer to:

Barenaked Ladies, Canadian rock band which sometimes uses the adjective in associated projects such as Barenaked for the Holidays
BareNaked, an album by Jennifer Love Hewitt
BareNaked (song), a song from the album